The 2006 Tour de Langkawi was the 11th edition of the Tour de Langkawi, a cycling stage race that took place in Malaysia. It started on 3 February in Kuala Lumpur and ended on 12 February in Kuala Lumpur. In fact, this race was rated by the Union Cycliste Internationale (UCI) as a 2.HC (hors category) race on the 2005–06 UCI Asia Tour calendar.

David George of South Africa won the race, followed by Francesco Bellotti of Italy second and Gabriele Missaglia of Italy third. Steffen Radochla of Germany won the points classification category and David George won the mountains classification category. South Africa won the team classification category.

Stages
The cyclists competed in 10 stages, covering a distance of 1,161.4 kilometres. Due to the extreme weather conditions(heavy downpour) experienced during the Stage 10 of the 2006 Tour de Langkawi, the stage result was abandoned according to the decision of the College of Commissaires and the Race Organizer. All classification would be as at the end of Stage 9. However, Ángel Vallejo Domínguez who had a substantial lone lead at the time of the decision abandon was made had been awarded the stage.

Classification leadership

Final standings

General classification

Points classification

Mountains classification

Asian rider classification

Team classification

Asian team classification

List of teams and riders
A total of 20 teams were invited to participate in the 2006 Tour de Langkawi. Out of the 119 riders, a total of 102 riders made it to the finish in Kuala Lumpur.

 South Africa
  Ryan Cox
  Jacques Fullard
  David George
  Rodney Green
  Darren Lill
  Jeremy Maartens
 
  José Serpa
  Wladimir Belli
  Angelo Furlan
  Alberto Loddo
  Gabriele Missaglia
  Walter Pedraza
 Malaysia
  Shahrulneeza Razali
  Ahmad Fallanie Ali
  Mohd Fauzan Ahmad Lutfi
  Suhardi Hassan
  Mohd Jasmin Ruslan
  Mohd Sayuti Mohd Zahit
 
  Stef Clement
  Andy Flickinger
  Yohann Gène
  Yoann Le Boulanger
  Laurent Lefèvre
  Anthony Ravard
 
  Francesco Bellotti
  Sébastien Hinault
  Christophe Le Mével
  Cyril Lemoine
  Benoît Poilvet
  Saul Raisin

 
  Julio Alberto Pérez
  Mirko Allegrini
  Guillermo Bongiorno
  Sergiy Matveyev
  Maximiliano Richeze
 Casino Filipino
  Victor Espiritu
  Bernardo Luzon
  Merculio Ramos
  Albert Primero
  Sherwin Carrera
  Sherwin Diamsay
 
  Shawn Milne
  César Grajales
  Oleg Grishkin
  Bernard Van Ulden
  Burke Swindlehurst
  Mark Walters
 
  Nácor Burgos
  José Miguel Elías
  Raúl García de Mateos
  Daniel Moreno
  Xavier Tondo
  Ángel Vallejo Domínguez
 
  Ben Greenwood
  Kristian House
  Chris Newton
  Evan Oliphant
  Rob Partridge
  Robin Sharman

 Yawadoo-Colba-ABM
  Gert Vanderaerden
  Koen Das
  Frederik Penne
  Gianni Riemslagh
  Frank Van Kuik
  Micheal Vanderaerden
 Great Britain
  Russell Downing
  Matt Brammeier
  Mark Cavendish
  Edward Clancy
  Geraint Thomas
  Julian Winn
 
  Elio Aggiano
  Gene Bates
  Roger Beuchat
  Andreas Dietziker
  Massimo Iannetti
  Samuele Marzoli
 
  Grégory Habeaux
  Jean-Claude Lebeau
  Filip Meirhaeghe
  Sven Renders
  David Verheyen
  Johan Verstrepen
 Équipe Asia
  Ng Yong Li
  Loh Sea Keong
  Mohd Saiful Anuar Aziz
  Yevgeniy Yakalov
  Vyacheslav Dyadichkin
  Hari Fitrianto

 
  Renaud Dion
  Julien Loubet
  Laurent Mangel
  Carl Naibo
  Erki Pütsep
  Christophe Riblon
 Wismilak
  Tonton Susanto
  Wawan Setyobudi
  Sulisttiyono Sulisttiyono
  Matnur Matnur
  Sama'i Sama'i
  Adi Wibowo
 Wiesenhof–Akud
  Steffen Radochla
  Torsten Schmidt
  Robert Retschke
  Corey Sweet
  Tomáš Konečný
  Lars Wackernagel
 
  Hossein Askari
  Paul Griffin
  Lau Kuan-hua
  David McCann
  Ghader Mizbani
  Peng Kuei-hsiang
 Japan
  Takumi Beppu
  Koji Fukushima
  Shinichi Fukushima
  Takashi Miyazawa
  Kazuhiro Mori
  Taiji Nishitani

References

Tour de Langkawi
2006 in road cycling
2006 in Malaysian sport